

Events

January–March 

 January 2 – Webb C. Ball introduces railroad chronometers, which become the general railroad timepiece standards in North America.
 Mark Twain started writing Puddn'head Wilson.
 January 6 – The Washington National Cathedral is chartered by Congress; the charter is signed by President Benjamin Harrison.
 January 13
 The Independent Labour Party of the United Kingdom has its first meeting.
 U.S. Marines from the USS Boston land in Honolulu, Hawaii, to prevent the queen from abrogating the Bayonet Constitution.
 January 15 – The Telefon Hírmondó service starts with around 60 subscribers, in Budapest.
 January 17 – Overthrow of the Kingdom of Hawaii: Lorrin A. Thurston and the Citizen's Committee of Public Safety in Hawaii, with the intervention of the United States Marine Corps, overthrow the government of Queen Liliuokalani.
 January 21
 The Cherry Sisters first perform in Marion, Iowa.
 The Tati Concessions Land, formerly part of Matabeleland, is formally annexed to the Bechuanaland Protectorate, now Botswana.
 February 1 – Thomas Edison finishes construction of the first motion picture studio in West Orange, New Jersey.
 February 11–19 – White Star Line  sinks without a trace in heavy seas on the Liverpool–New York transatlantic passage.
 February 23 – Rudolf Diesel receives a patent for the diesel engine.
 February 24 – American University is established by an Act of Congress, in Washington, D.C.
 February 28 – USS Indiana, the first battleship in the United States Navy comparable to other nation's battleships of the time, is launched.
 March 4 – Grover Cleveland is sworn in as the 24th President of the United States.
 March 6 – The Liverpool Overhead Railway opened with 2-car electric multiple units, the first to operate in the world. 
 March 10 – Ivory Coast becomes a French colony.
 March 20 – In Belgium, Adam Worth is sentenced to 7 years for robbery (he is released in 1897).

April–June 

 April 1 – The rank of Chief Petty Officer is established in the United States Navy.
 April 6 – The iconic Salt Lake Temple of the Church of Jesus Christ of Latter-day Saints is dedicated, after 40 years of construction.
 April 8 – The first recorded college basketball game occurs in Beaver Falls, Pennsylvania, between the Geneva College Covenanters and the New Brighton YMCA.
 April 17
 Belgian general strike of 1893: Riots erupt in Mons; the day after, the Belgian Parliament approves universal male suffrage.
 The Alpha Xi Delta Sorority is founded at Lombard College, in Galesburg, Illinois.
 May – The Free Presbyterian Church of Scotland is formed.
 May 1 – The 1893 World's Fair, also known as the World's Columbian Exposition, opens to the public in Chicago, Illinois. The first United States commemorative postage stamps are issued for the Exposition.
 May 5 – Panic of 1893: A crash on the New York Stock Exchange starts a depression.
 May 9 – Edison's 1½ inch system of Kinetoscope is first demonstrated in public, at the Brooklyn Institute.
 May 10 – Nix v. Hedden: the United States Supreme Court legally declares the tomato to be a vegetable.

 May 23 – Mahatma Gandhi arrives in South Africa, where he will live until 1914, lead non-violent protests on behalf of Indian immigrants in the South African Republic (Transvaal), and generally have a deeper experience of such activities during these years.
 June 4 – The Anti-Saloon League is incorporated, originally as a state organization, in Oberlin, Ohio.  On December 18, 1895, it becomes a nationwide organization.  The same year, the American Council on Alcohol Problems is established, along with the Committee of Fifty for the Study of the Liquor Problem.
 June 6 – Wedding of Prince George, Duke of York, and Princess Mary of Teck: the future King George V of the United Kingdom marries at St James's Palace in London.
 June 15 – 1893 German federal election: Small anti-Semitic parties secure 2.9% of the vote.
 June 17 – Gold is found in Kalgoorlie, Western Australia.
 June 20
 The Wengernalpbahn railway in Wengen, Switzerland (Canton of Bern) is opened.
 Lizzie Borden is acquitted of murdering her parents in Fall River, Massachusetts in 1892.
 June 29 – Unveiling of the Shaftesbury Memorial Fountain at Piccadilly Circus in London with its statue of Anteros.

July–September 

 July 1 – U.S. President Grover Cleveland is operated on in secret.
 July 6 – The small town of Pomeroy, Iowa, is nearly destroyed by a tornado; 71 people are killed and 200 injured.
 July 11
 Liberal general and politician José Santos Zelaya leads a successful revolt in Nicaragua.
 Kōkichi Mikimoto, in Japan, develops the method to seed and grow cultured pearls.
 July 13
 Paknam Incident: Two French Navy ships are fired upon by Siamese cannons stationed at the Paknam Fort, that guards the Chao Phraya River.  Three months later, Siam is forced to cede modern day Laos to France.  
 Frederick Jackson Turner gives a lecture titled "The Significance of the Frontier in American History" before the American Historical Association in Chicago.
 Scottish Association football club Dundee F.C. is formed.
 July 25 – The Corinth Canal is completed in Greece.
 August 15 – The Ibadan area becomes a British protectorate, after a treaty signed by Fijabi, the Baale of Ibadan with the British acting Governor of Lagos, George C. Denton.
 August 27 – The Sea Islands hurricane hits Savannah, Georgia, Charleston, South Carolina, and the Sea Islands, killing 1,000–2,000.

 September 1 – William Ewart Gladstone's Government of Ireland Bill 1893, intended to give Ireland self-government, is rejected by the U.K. Parliament.
 September 7
 Under pressure of a general strike, the Belgian Federal Parliament enacts general multiple suffrage.
 Russian monitor Rusalka sinks in a storm in the Gulf of Finland, with the loss of all 177 crew; her hulk is eventually discovered in 2003 off Helsinki.
 Genoa Cricket & Athletic Club, the oldest Italian football club, is formed.
 September 11 – The World Parliament of Religions opens as an adjunct to the World's Columbian Exposition in Chicago; Bengali Hindu monk Swami Vivekananda receives a standing ovation for his address in response to his welcoming.
 September 12 – American Temperance University begins classes in Harriman, Tennessee (it closes after 15 years, in May 1908).
 September 16 – Settlers make a land run for prime land in the Cherokee Strip in Oklahoma.
 September 19
 Swami Vivekananda delivers an inspiring speech on his paper at the World Parliament of Religions in Chicago.
 New Zealand becomes the first country in the world to grant women the right to vote.
 September 21 – Brothers Charles and Frank Duryea drive the first gasoline-powered motorcar in America, on public roads in Springfield, Massachusetts.
 September 23 – The Baháʼí Faith is first publicly mentioned in the United States, at the World Parliament of Religions in Chicago.
 September 27 – The World Parliament of Religions holds its closing meeting in Chicago.
 September 28 – The Portuguese sports club Futebol Clube do Porto is founded.

October–December 

 October 10 – The first car number plates appear in Paris, France.
 October 13 
 The first students enter St Hilda's College, Oxford, England, founded for women by Dorothea Beale.
 The Franco-Siamese Treaty of 1893 is signed, as the Kingdom of Siam cedes all of its territories east of the Mekong River to France, creating the territory of Laos.
 October 14 – According to a Japanese government official confirmed report, a devastating levee collapse, flash flood and landslide hit and damaged around Kyushu Island, Shikoku Island and western Honshū, due to a strong typhoon wind in Japan, an official document reports 2,044 people perished.
 October 16 – American sisters Patty Hill and Mildred J. Hill copyright their book Song Stories for the Kindergarten including "Good Morning to All".  The melody, by Mildred Hill, is later adapted, without authorization, by Robert H. Coleman as "Good Morning to You!", with the second stanza containing the words to "Happy Birthday to You", leading to a successful copyright lawsuit by the Hill sisters in 1934. 
 October 23 – The Internal Macedonian Revolutionary Organization (IMRO) is founded by Bulgarians, in the town of Thessaloniki. Its aim is to liberate the region of Macedonia from the Ottoman Turks.
 October 28 (October 16 O.S.) – In Saint Petersburg (Russia), Pyotr Ilyich Tchaikovsky conducts the first performance of his Symphony No. 6 in B minor, Pathétique, nine days before his death.
 October 30 – The 1893 World's Fair, also known as the World's Columbian Exposition, closes.
 November 7 – Colorado women are granted the right to vote.
 November 12 – The Durand Line is established as the boundary between British India and Afghanistan, by a memorandum of understanding signed by Sir Mortimer Durand, Foreign Secretary of British India, and Abdur Rahman Khan, Amir of Afghanistan.
 November 15 – FC Basel Association football club is founded in Switzerland.
 November 16 – Athletic club Královské Vinohrady, later Sparta Prague, is founded.
 November 26 – Arthur Conan Doyle's story "The Adventure of the Final Problem", published in the December dated issue of The Strand Magazine and serialized in Sunday newspapers worldwide, surprises the reading public by revealing that his popular character Sherlock Holmes had apparently died at the Reichenbach Falls on May 4, 1891.
 December – Carl Anton Larsen becomes the first man to ski in Antarctica.
 December 4 – First Matabele War: The Shangani Patrol of British South Africa Company soldiers is ambushed and annihilated, by more than 3,000 Matabele warriors.
 December 5 – Plural voting is abolished in New South Wales.
 December 8 – In the United States, the National Education Association releases the final report from the Committee of Ten at a conference at Columbia University, recommending standardization of the high school curriculum. 
 December 16 – Antonín Dvořák's Symphony No. 9 (From the New World) receives its premiere at Carnegie Hall, New York City.
 December 20 – Evergreen Park, Illinois, is incorporated.

Date unknown 
 The first recumbent bicycle, the Fautenil Vélociped, is made in France.
 Sudbury, Ontario, Canada, is incorporated as a town.
 German physicist Wilhelm Wien formulates Wien's displacement law.
 TMI Episcopal is founded in San Antonio as "The West Texas School for Boys", quickly changed to "West Texas Military Academy", by Bishop James S. Johnston.
 Booker T. Washington High School (Houston) is founded as "Colored High", the first African-American high school in Houston, Texas.
 The National Sculpture Society (NSS) is founded in the United States.
 A 16th century Ardabil Carpet from Persia enters the collection of the South Kensington Museum in London.
 The University of Exeter Debating Society is founded in England as the Exeter Debating Society at the Royal Albert Memorial College.
 Dulwich Hamlet F.C. is founded in London.
 American pharmacist Caleb Bradham invents the recipe for what later becomes Pepsi. He originally sells it as 'Brad's Drink' at his pharmacy in New Bern, North Carolina.
 The Girls' Brigade is founded in Dublin, Ireland, origin of the international Christian youth organisation.
 71.2% of the working population of São Paulo is foreign-born.
 By 1893 – 8,000 Chinese have arrived in Cuba.

Births

January–March 

 January 1 – Minoru Sasaki, Japanese general (d. 1961)
 January 5 – Paramahansa Yogananda, Indian guru (d. 1952)
 January 10 – Vicente Huidobro, Chilean poet (d. 1948)
 January 11 – Anthony M. Rud, American writer (d. 1942)
 January 12
 Edward Selzer, American film producer (d. 1970)
 Hermann Göring, German Nazi official (d. 1946)
 Alfred Rosenberg, German Nazi official (d. 1946)
 January 13 – Roy Cazaly, Australian rules footballer (d. 1963)
 VMAni, (born Bibi Watson), American actress (d. 2010)
 January 15 – Ivor Novello, Welsh actor, musician (d. 1951)
 January 22
Arthur Smith, Australian public servant (d. 1971)
Conrad Veidt, German actor (d. 1943)
Frankie Yale, American gangster (d. 1928)
 January 27 – Soong Ching-ling, one of the Soong sisters, wife of Chinese president Sun Yat-sen (d. 1981)
 January 28 – Catherine Caradja, Romanian aristocrat, philanthropist (d. 1993)
 February 3 – Gaston Julia, French mathematician (d. 1978)
 February 9 – Georgios Athanasiadis-Novas, Prime Minister of Greece (d. 1987)
 February 10 – Jimmy Durante, American actor, singer, and comedian (d. 1980)
 February 12 – Omar Bradley, American general (d. 1981)
 February 13
Ana Pauker, Romanian communist politician (d. 1960)
Zénon Bernard, Luxembourgish communist politician (d. 1942)
 February 16
Katharine Cornell, American actress (d. 1974)
Mikhail Tukhachevsky, Soviet Army officer (d. 1937)
 February 19 – Sir Cedric Hardwicke, English actor (d. 1964)
 February 21 – Andrés Segovia, Spanish guitarist (d. 1987)
 February 24 – Tokushichi Mishima, Japanese inventor, engineer (d. 1975)
 February 28 – Ivan Vasilyov, Bulgarian architect (d. 1979)
 March 1 – Mercedes de Acosta, American poet, playwright, costume designer, and socialite (d. 1968)
 March 3
 Beatrice Wood, American artist, ceramicist (d. 1998)
 Ivon Hitchens, English painter (d. 1979)
 March 5 – Kōtoku Satō, Japanese general (d. 1959)
 March 7 – Elsa Ratassepp, Estonian actress (d. 1972)
 March 8 – Mississippi John Hurt, American country blues singer, guitarist (d. 1966) (some sources give his year of birth as 1892) 
 March 11 – Wanda Gág, American children's author and artist (d. 1946)
 March 14 – Arthur C. Davis, American admiral (d. 1965)
 March 18 – Wilfred Owen, English soldier, poet (d. 1918)
 March 19 – José María Velasco Ibarra, former President of Ecuador (d. 1979)
 March 22 – Kleber Claux, French-born Australian anarchist, nudist (d. 1971)
 March 24 
 Walter Baade, German astronomer (d. 1960)
 Emmy Sonnemann, German actress, second wife of Hermann Göring (d. 1973)
 March 26 – Palmiro Togliatti, Italian communist leader (d. 1964)
 March 27 – Karl Mannheim, German sociologist (d. 1947)
 March 30
Theodor Krancke, German admiral (d. 1973)
Ethel Owen, American actress (d. 1997)
 March 31 – Herbert Meinhard Mühlpfordt, German historian (d. 1982)

April–June 

 April 1 – Cicely Courtneidge, British actress (d. 1980)
 April 3 – Leslie Howard, English actor (d. 1943)
 April 6 – Alfred Gerstenberg, German Luftwaffe general (d. 1959)
 April 7 – José de Almada Negreiros, Portuguese artist (d. 1970)
 April 8 – Paul Alexiu, Romanian general (d. 1963)
 April 9
 Victor Gollancz, British publisher (d. 1967)
 Rahul Sankrityayan, Indian historian, writer, scholar (d. 1963)
 April 11 – Dean Acheson, 51st United States Secretary of State (d. 1971)
 April 12 – Robert Harron, American actor (d. 1920)
 April 15 – Maximilian Ritter von Pohl, German army, air force officer (d. 1951)
 April 18 – Georges Boulanger, Romanian violinist (d. 1958)
 April 20
 Harold Lloyd, American actor (d. 1971)
 Joan Miró, Spanish painter, sculptor (d. 1983)
 Edna Parker, American supercentenarian (d. 2008)
 April 21 – Matsuji Ijuin, Japanese admiral (d. 1944)
 April 23 – Allen Dulles, American Central Intelligence Agency director (d. 1969)
 April 29 – Harold Urey, American chemist, Nobel Prize laureate (d. 1981)
 April 30 – Harold Breen, Australian public servant (d. 1966)
 May 3 – Konstantine Gamsakhurdia, Georgian writer, public benefactor (d. 1975)
 May 8
 Teddy Wakelam, English sports broadcaster, rugby union player (d. 1963)
 Francis Ouimet, American golfer, businessman (d. 1967)
 May 9 – Regina Quintanilha, first Portuguese female lawyer (d. 1967)
 May 16 – Clement Martyn Doke, South African linguist (d. 1980)
 May 21 – Giles Chippindall, Australian public servant (d. 1969)
 May 23 – Ulysses S. Grant IV, American geologist, paleontologist (d. 1977)
 May 25 – Ernest "Pop" Stoneman, American country music artist (d. 1968)
 June 4 – Armand Călinescu, 39th Prime Minister of Romania (d. 1939)
 June 7 – Gillis Grafström, Swedish figure skater (d. 1938)
 June 12 – John R. Hodge, United States Army general (d. 1963)
 June 13 – Dorothy L. Sayers, British crime writer, poet, playwright and essayist (d. 1957)
 June 14 – Siggie Nordstrom, American model, actress, entertainer, socialite and singer (d. 1980)
 June 23 – Herman H. Hanneken, United States Marine Corps officer (d. 1986)
 June 24
 Roy O. Disney, brother, business partner of Walter Elias Disney (d. 1971)
 Suzanne La Follette, American libertarian feminist (d. 1983)
 June 26 – Big Bill Broonzy, American blues singer, composer (d. 1958) (some sources give his year of birth as 1903) 
 June 29 – Aarre Merikanto, Finnish composer (d. 1958)
 June 30
Harold Laski, British political theorist, economist (d. 1950)
Walter Ulbricht, German communist politician (d. 1973)

July–September 

 July 1 – Mario de Bernardi, Italian aviator (d. 1959)
 July 3 – Mississippi John Hurt, American musician (d. 1966)
 July 4 – Norman Manley, Jamaican statesman (d. 1969)
 July 5 – Giuseppe Caselli, Italian painter (d. 1976)
 July 9 – George Geary, English cricketer (d. 1981)
 July 11 – Edward "Eddie" Stinson, American aviator, aircraft manufacturer (d. 1932)
 July 12 
 Ernest Cadine, French weightlifter (d. 1978)
 John Gould Moyer, American naval officer, 31st Governor of American Samoa (d. 1976)
 July 18 – Richard Dix, American actor (d. 1949)
 July 20 
 Arno von Lenski, German military officer, general (d. 1986)
 George Llewelyn Davies, British inspiration for Peter Pan (d. 1915)
 July 22 – Karl Menninger, American psychiatrist (d. 1990)
 July 25 – Dorothy Dickson, American-born actress, socialite (d. 1995)
 July 28 – Rued Langgaard, Danish composer, organist (d. 1952)
 July 30 – Fatima Jinnah, Pakistani Mother of the Nation (d. 1967)
 August 4
 Amy Hannah Adamson, Australian principal (d. 1963)
 Fritz Gause, German historian (d. 1973)
 August 6 – Wright Patman, American politician (d. 1976)
 August 14
 Francis Dvornik, Czech historian (d. 1975)
 Carl Benton Reid, American actor (d. 1973)
 August 15 – Leslie Comrie, New Zealand astronomer, computing pioneer (d. 1950)
 August 17 – Mae West, American actress, playwright, screenwriter, and sex symbol (d. 1980)
 August 18 – Frank Linke-Crawford, Austro-Hungarian fighter pilot (d. 1918)
 August 22
 Dorothy Parker, American writer (d. 1967)
 Wilfred Kitching, the 7th General of The Salvation Army (d. 1977)
 August 23 – Aleksandr Loktionov, Soviet general (d. 1941)
 August 24 – Haim Ernst Wertheimer German-born Israeli biochemist, recipient of the Israel Prize (d. 1978)
 August 25 – Henry Trendley Dean, American dental researcher (d. 1962)
 August 30 – Huey Long, Louisiana governor and senator (d. 1935)
 September 6 – Claire Lee Chennault, American aviator, general, and leader of the Flying Tigers (d. 1958)
 September 10
Juana Bormann, German Nazi war criminal (d. 1945) 
 September 12 – Frederick William Franz, American President of Jehovah's Witnesses (d. 1992)
 September 13 – Larry Shields, American musician (d. 1953)
 September 16 – Albert Szent-Györgyi, Hungarian physiologist, Nobel Prize laureate (d. 1986)
 September 18 – Arthur Benjamin, Australian composer (d. 1960)
 September 23 – Wiljo Tuompo, Finnish general (d. 1957)
 September 25 – Ryūnosuke Kusaka, Japanese admiral (d. 1971)
 September 30 – Lansdale Sasscer, U.S. Congressman (d. 1964)

October–December 

 October 1  – Marianne Brandt, German industrial designer (d. 1983)
 October 8  – Clarence Williams, American jazz pianist and composer (d. 1965) (some sources give his year of birth as 1898)
 October 9  – Mário de Andrade, Brazilian writer, photographer (d. 1945)
 October 14 – Lillian Gish, American actress (d. 1993)
 October 15 – King Carol II of Romania (d. 1953)
 October 18
 Sidney Holland, 25th Prime Minister of New Zealand (d. 1961)
 George Ohsawa, Japanese founder of Macrobiotics (d. 1966)
 October 20 – Noboru Ishizaki, Japanese admiral (d. 1959)
 October 23 – Gummo Marx, American comedian, actor (d. 1977)
 October 26 – Oliver P. Smith, American general (d. 1977)
 November 2 – Victor Crutchley, British admiral (d. 1986)
 November 5 – Raymond Loewy, French-born American industrial designer (d. 1986)
 November 8 – Prajadhipok, Rama VII, King of Siam (d. 1941)
 November 10 – John P. Marquand, American novelist (d. 1960)
 November 12 – Leonard F. Wing, American general, politician (d. 1945)
 November 13 – Edward Adelbert Doisy, American biochemist, recipient of the Nobel Prize in Physiology or Medicine (d. 1986)
 November 20 – Grace Darmond, Canadian-born American actress (d. 1963)
 November 22
 Lazar Kaganovich, Soviet politician, Great Purge perpetrator (d. 1991) 
 Raymond Collishaw, Canadian World War I fighter ace (d. 1976)
 November 24 – Fern Andra, American actress (d. 1974)
 November 27 – Carlos Alberto Arroyo del Río, 26th President of Ecuador (d. 1969)
 November 28 – Talbot Baines Reed, English author (b. 1852)
 December 1  – Henry J. Cadbury, American biblical scholar, Quaker (d. 1974)
 December 2 – Leo Ornstein, Russian-born composer, pianist (d. 2002)
 December 3
 Walter Stuart Diehl, American naval officer, aeronautical engineer (d. 1976)
 Wilhelm Pelikan, Austrian chemist (d. 1981)
 December 7
Fay Bainter, American actress (d. 1968)
Hermann Balck, German general (d. 1982)
 December 8  – Pierre Etchebaster, French real tennis player (d. 1980)
 December 12 – Edward G. Robinson, Romanian-American actor (d. 1973)
 December 23 – Ann Pennington, American actress, dancer (d. 1971)
 December 26 – Mao Zedong, Chinese communist leader (d. 1976)
 December 29 – Berthold Bartosch, Bohemian animator (d. 1968)

Deaths

January–June 

 January 2 – John Obadiah Westwood, British entomologist (b. 1805)
 January 7 – Jožef Stefan, Slovenian physicist, mathematician, and poet (b. 1835)
 January 11 – Benjamin Butler, American lawyer, politician, and general (b. 1818)
 January 17 – Rutherford B. Hayes, 70, 19th President of the United States (b. 1822)
 January 23 – Lucius Quintus Cincinnatus Lamar, U.S. Supreme Court justice (b. 1825)
 January 27 – James G. Blaine, Speaker of the United States House of Representatives, U.S. Senator, and U.S. Secretary of State (b. 1830)
 February 1 – George Henry Sanderson, Mayor of San Francisco (b. 1824)
 February 4 – Concepción Arenal, Spanish feminist writer, activist (b. 1820)
 February 8 – Jennie Casseday, American philanthropist (b. 1840)
 February 10 – Henry Churchill de Mille, American playwright, (b.1853)
 February 13 – Ignacio Manuel Altamirano, first modern Mexican novelist (Clemencia) and (El Zarco) (b. 1834)
 February 17 – Sir Arthur Cumming, British admiral (b. 1817)
 February 18
 Serranus Clinton Hastings, American politician (b. 1814)
 King George Tupou I of Tonga (b. 1797)
 February 20 – P. G. T. Beauregard, American Confederate general (b. 1818)
 March 7 – Francisco Robles, 6th President of Ecuador (b. 1811)
 March 16 – William H. Illingworth, English photographer (b. 1844)
 March 17
 Lucy Isabella Buckstone, English actress (b. 1857) 
 Jules Ferry, French premier (b. 1832)
 March 18 
 George Alexander Baird, (Squire Abington), wealthy English horse breeder (b. 1861)
 Bandō Kakitsu I, Japanese kabuki actor (b. 1847)
 March 21 – Mary Foot Seymour, American school founder (b. 1846)
 March 30 – Jane Sym-Mackenzie, second wife of Canada's second prime minister (b. 1825)
 April 8 – August Czartoryski, Polish prince (b. 1858)
 April 17 – Lucy Larcom, American teacher and author (b. 1824)
 April 19 – John Addington Symonds, English poet, literary critic (b. 1840)
 April 22 – Edward Fitzgerald Beale, American adventurer, businessman (b. 1822)
 April 26 – Harriette Baker, American children's books author (b. 1815)
 April 27 – John Ballance, 14th Premier of New Zealand (b. 1839)
 May 8 – Manuel González Flores, 31st President of Mexico (b. 1833)
 May 10 – Ion Emanuel Florescu, Romanian general and politician, two-time Prime Minister of Romania (b. 1819)
 June 1 – Silva Porto, Portuguese painter (b. 1850)
 June 7 – Edwin Booth, American actor (b. 1833)
 June 14 – Jakob Frohschammer, German theologian, philosopher (b. 1821)
 June 19 – Margaret Manton Merrill, English-born American journalist and translator (b. 1859)
 June 21 – Leland Stanford, Governor of California (b. 1824)
 June 22 – Sir George Tryon, British admiral (b. 1832)
 June 23
Sir William Fox, 2nd Premier of New Zealand (b. 1812)
Sir Theophilus Shepstone, South African statesman (b. 1817)

July–December 

 July 2 – Georgiana Drew, American actress, comedian (b. 1856)
 July 6 – Guy de Maupassant, French writer (b. 1850)
 July 16 – Antonio Ghislanzoni, Italian politician, journalist (b. 1833)
 August 6 – Jean-Jacques Challet-Venel, member of the Swiss Federal Council (b. 1811)
 August 7 – Alfredo Catalani, Italian composer (b. 1854)
 August 16 – Jean-Martin Charcot, French neurologist (b. 1825)
 August 20 – Baron Alexander Wassilko von Serecki, Governor of the Duchy of Bucovina,  member of the Herrenhaus (b. 1827)
 August 31 – Lucy Hamilton Hooper, American writer and editor (b. 1835)
 September 9 – Friedrich Traugott Kützing, German pharmacist, botanist and phycologist (b. 1807)
 September 28 – Bella French Swisher, American writer, editor, and publisher (b. 1837)
 October 6 – Ford Madox Brown, English painter (b. 1821)
 October 8 – John Willis Menard, African-American politician (b. 1838)
 October 10 – Lip Pike, American baseball player (b. 1845)
 October 17 – Patrice de MacMahon, Duke of Magenta, French general, politician, and 1st president of the Third Republic (1875-1879) (b. 1808)
 October 18 – Charles Gounod, French composer (b. 1818)
 October 22 – Duleep Singh, ruler of Punjab (b. 1838)
 October 30 – Sir John Abbott, 3rd Prime Minister of Canada (b. 1821)
 November 6 – Pyotr Ilyich Tchaikovsky, Russian composer (b. 1840)
 November 8 – Annie Pixley, American actress (b. 1848)
 November 11 – Charles H. Bell, American politician (b. 1823)
 November 17 – Alexander of Battenberg, first prince of Bulgaria (b. 1857)
 November 22 – James Calder, 5th President of Pennsylvania State University (b. 1826)
 November 24 – Belle Hunt Shortridge, American author (b. 1858)
 November 28 – Sir Alexander Cunningham, British engineer and archaeologist (b. 1814)
 December 8 – Alexandru Cernat, Moldavian-born Romanian general and politician (b. 1828)
 December 11 – William Milligan, Scottish theologian (b. 1821)
 December 25 – Marie Durocher, Brazilian obstetrician, physician (b. 1809)

Date unknown 
 Margaret Fox, American spiritualist medium (b. 1833)

References

Further reading
 The Year-book of the Imperial Institute of the United Kingdom, the colonies and India: a statistical record of the resources and trade of the colonial and Indian possessions of the British Empire (2nd. ed. 1893) 880pp;  online edition